Microvoluta dolichura is a species of sea snail, a marine gastropod mollusk in the family Volutomitridae.

Description

Distribution
This marine species occurs in the Coral Sea

References

 MolluscaBase eds. (2021). MolluscaBase. Microvoluta dolichura Bouchet & Kantor, 2004. Accessed through: World Register of Marine Species at: http://www.marinespecies.org/aphia.php?p=taxdetails&id=389142 on 2021-07-28
 Y. Kantor, 2010, Checklist of Recent Volutomitridae (

Volutomitridae
Gastropods described in 2004